Pursuit of Loneliness is a 2012 American film written and directed by Laurence Thrush. The black and white documentary-styled film is about the loneliness of old age, in which an old lady has died anonymously in a Los Angeles county hospital. The cast includes Joy Hille, Sandra Escalante, Sharon Munfus, Kirsi Toivanen, and Natalie Fouron.

References

External links
 
"Meet the 2012 Sundance Filmmakers #46: Lawrence Thrush, 'Pursuit of Loneliness'" at IndieWire

2012 independent films
2010s English-language films
American independent films
American drama films
2010s American films